César Junior Viza Seminario (born 3 April 1985) is a Peruvian footballer who plays as an attacking midfielder. He currently plays for Deportivo Llacuabamba in the Peruvian Primera División.

Honours
Alianza Lima
Torneo Descentralizado (3): 2003, 2004, 2006

Beitar Jerusalem
Israeli Premier League (1):
2007–08
Israel State Cup (1):
2007-08
Toto Cup Al (1):
2009–10

References

External links

Junior Viza at one.co.il 

1985 births
Living people
Footballers from Lima
Association football midfielders
Peruvian footballers
Peruvian expatriate footballers
Peru international footballers
Club Alianza Lima footballers
Beitar Jerusalem F.C. players
Hapoel Petah Tikva F.C. players
Juan Aurich footballers
Club Deportivo Universidad César Vallejo footballers
Cienciano footballers
Unión Huaral footballers
Peruvian Primera División players
Peruvian Segunda División players
Israeli Premier League players
Peruvian expatriate sportspeople in Israel
Expatriate footballers in Israel